Lake Rotokawau is the name of numerous lakes in New Zealand:

Lake Rotokawau (Aupouri Peninsula), Northland
Lake Rotokawau (Karikari Peninsula), Northland
Lake Rotokawau (Kaipara), Northland
Lake Rotokawau (Waikato)
Lake Rotokawau (Bay of Plenty)
Lake Rotokawau (Chatham Islands)

See also
Lake Rotokauwau